Hypidone (developmental code name YL-0919) is an investigational serotonergic antidepressant which is under development for the treatment of major depressive disorder. It acts as a serotonin reuptake inhibitor, 5-HT1A receptor partial agonist, and 5-HT6 receptor full agonist. It is used as the hydrochloride salt. As of January 2021, hypidone is in phase 2 clinical trials for major depressive disorder.

See also
 List of investigational antidepressants

References

External links
 Hypidone hydrochloride - AdisInsight

5-HT1A agonists
5-HT6 agonists
Tertiary alcohols
Antidepressants
Benzyl compounds
Experimental drugs
Ketones
Piperidines
Pyridones
Serotonin reuptake inhibitors